NEOMAD is a 3-episode futuristic fantasy adventure series, created as part of a governmentally supported community art project. The comic brings together live action film, with animation, music and voice overs. The series was created with the community of Roebourne, Western Australia as part of art and social justice organisation, Big hART and their Yijala Yala Project.

The project was created in late 2010 with the assistance of over 40 young people aged between 7 and 14 from the leramugadu (Roebourne) community through a series of workshops conducted by  Stu Campbell known as Sutu. The workshops engaged the young people in a host of skills, including scriptwriting, filmmaking, literacy, Photoshop and sound recording over a period of 18 months. The workshops brought new digital media skills to young people, with Campbell spending more than 500 hours teaching the young participants how to apply a complex colouring system to more than 600 scenes to create NEOMAD.

The young people who helped to create NEOMAD also star in the work as the heroes the Love Punks or the gravity defying Satellite Sisters

Location

NEOMAD is set by Murujuga (the Burrup Peninsula). Its location is home to approximately one million petroglyphs (art etched in rock), some of which are over thirty thousand years old. The carvings are ancient and denote key site markers for survival, food sources, ceremonial sites and spirituality. The role of NEOMAD is to bring not only the past into the current cultural sphere of the community but also to express thousands of years of cultural heritage associated with Murujuga through contemporary tools.

Yijala Yala Project

Yijala Yala is a community based project created by the organisation Big hART with, and for, the community of Roebourne in the Pilbara region of Western Australia. The project has sought to highlight cultural heritage as continually evolving in the here and now, as a living entity, changing and growing rather than the static way it has previously been portrayed. The name Yijala Yala was given to the project, bringing with it all the significance and emphasis of the methodology. Yijala drawing its meaning from 'now' in Ngarluma and Yala meaning 'now' in Yindjibarndi the name drawing from the two dominant Aboriginal languages spoken in leramagadu (Roebourne).

The project has yielded a great many collaborations, with huge amounts of different creative work being done in the community, from dance to music, theatre, and digital media. Short films have been made about the project, from documentaries about life on the land, and family stories to futuristic junk percussion, mysterious girls of the river and desert dance gangs.

Critical reception

NEOMAD has been presented at conferences throughout Australia and has been profiled extensively on throughout the media sphere and academic journals. It was featured in the Bucheon International Comic Festival in South Korea in 2012 and named by the prestigious Kirkus Reviews as one of the best books of 2013, earning it the prestigious 'Kirkus Star' given to 'books of exceptional merit'.

The documentary which accompanied NEOMAD entitled 'How Do We Get To Space? The Story Of Love Punks and Satellite Sisters' was awarded the title of best documentary at the 2014 ATOM Awards.

NEOMAD was also featured in the 2014 ABC documentary about artist Stuart Campbell called Cyber Dreaming.

In 2014 NEOMAD was adapted for print and published by Gestalt Publishing.

As of 2016 Neomad was optioned to Melbourne-based animation company Viskatoons to be adapted in to an animated series. The comic has been profiled on The Guardian and The Huffington Post.

Awards and nominations

 NEOMAD was awarded Best Game/Multimedia Production at the 2013 ATOM Awards
 Kirkus Star from Kirkus Reviews for books of exceptional merit
 Finalist in the 2013 New Media Festival in Los Angeles
 2016 Gold Ledger Award for NEOMAD printed edition
 2014 Atom Awards Best Documentary – Short Form 'How do we get to space? The story of the Love Punks & the Satellite Sisters' (Big hART - directed by Chyna Campbell)

Episodes

 Episode 1: Space Junk
 Episode 2: 'The Last Crystal' 
 Episode 3: 'Porkchop Plots'

Funders

The considerable size of the project yielded funding and partnership internationally. The primary funders of the project were the Australian Government, Pluto LNG, and Woodside.

References

External links 

 https://www.killyourdarlingsjournal.com/2012/10/new-nomads-in-roebourne-the-neomad-app/
 https://au.news.yahoo.com/thewest/regional/north-west/a/31393693/roebourne-comic-series-neonomad-wins-gold-ledger-art-prize/
 http://bighart.org/
 http://yijalayala.bighart.org/neomad/
 https://www.facebook.com/neomadcomic/
 http://ledgerawards.org/

Culture of Western Australia
Pilbara
2010 comics debuts